Hydrorybina is a genus of moths of the family Crambidae.

Species
Hydrorybina fulvescens Munroe, 1977
Hydrorybina polusalis (Walker, 1859)
Hydrorybina pryeri (Butler, 1881)
Hydrorybina violascens (Hampson, 1917)

References

Odontiinae
Crambidae genera
Taxa named by George Hampson